Khosroshahi is an Iranian surname. Notable people with the surname include:

Behnam Khosroshahi (born 1989), Iranian cyclist
Hadi Khosroshahi (1939–2020), Iranian cleric and diplomat

See also
Khosrowshahi

Surnames of Iranian origin